Mary Nichols may refer to:

 Mary D. Nichols (born 1945), chairwoman of the California Air Resources Board
 Mary Pickering Nichols (1829–1915), American translator of German literature
 Mary Nichols (politician) (born 1949), member of the Missouri House of Representatives
 Mary Ann Nichols (1845–1888), one of the Whitechapel murder victims
 Mary Gove Nichols (1810–1884), American woman's rights and health reform advocate, and writer